Gmina Aleksandrów is a rural gmina (administrative district) in Biłgoraj County, Lublin Voivodeship, in eastern Poland.

The gmina contains part of the protected area called Puszcza Solska Landscape Park.

Villages
Gmina Aleksandrów contains the villages and settlements of Aleksandrów, Margole, Podlas and Sigła.

Neighbouring gminas
Gmina Aleksandrów is bordered by the gminas of Biłgoraj, Józefów, Księżpol, Łukowa and Tereszpol.

Massacres during Second World War
The area was the site of five massacres of Poles by German soldiers during the Second World War, in the village of Aleksandrów: August 1942, February, June and August 1943 and July 1944. On 6 July 1944 the largest massacre occurred. Between 444 and 446 people were murdered and 100 buildings burned down by the Germans, while 2500 people were sent to concentration camps.

References

Aleksandrow
Biłgoraj County
Massacres in Poland
Germany–Poland relations
World War II crimes in Poland